WebFetch is a set of Perl 5 modules written by Ian Kluft from 1998 through 2009 that provides a framework for retrieving information feeds from the Web, or posting a feed on a web site.  It is intended to be run on a Unix or Linux server automatically, such as from cron.  The current version 0.13 was released September 20, 2009.  It is Open Source software, licensed under the GNU General Public License.

WebFetch can collect various types of inputs via plugin modules and send or store them to various outputs also via plugin modules.  Inputs include RSS, Atom, local news feed files, and perl data structures.  Outputs include perl data structures, the Template Toolkit and pages in TWiki systems.

History
Before there were RSS and Atom aggregation, WebFetch started with modules to retrieve news in ad hoc feed formats of various web sites, including Slashdot.

WebFetch is available from the Comprehensive Perl Archive Network. The following Perl modules are included with it.
 WebFetch::Input::Atom - Atom feed reader
 WebFetch::Input::PerlStruct - Perl structure input
 WebFetch::Input::RSS - RSS feed reader
 WebFetch::Input::SiteNews - local "site news" file reader
 WebFetch::Output::Dump - perl structure dump output
 WebFetch::Output::TT - Template Toolkit output
 WebFetch::Output::TWiki - TWiki page output

The following Perl modules were based on ad hoc news formats from before RSS, and in some cases web scraping.  They used to be provided with WebFetch in the past, but were deprecated and removed.
 WebFetch::CNETnews
 WebFetch::CNNsearch
 WebFetch::COLA
 WebFetch::DebianNews
 WebFetch::Freshmeat
 WebFetch::LinuxDevNet
 WebFetch::LinuxTelephony
 WebFetch::LinuxToday
 WebFetch::ListSubs
 WebFetch::Slashdot
 WebFetch::32BitsOnline
 WebFetch::YahooBiz

References

External links
   
 WebFetch Add-On for TWiki

Perl modules
Web software
News aggregators
Atom (Web standard)
Unix Internet software